USS Bolster (ARS-38) was a  acquired by the U.S. Navy during World War II and remained in service during the Korean War and the Vietnam War. Her task was to come to the aid of stricken vessels.

Bolster was launched 23 December 1944 by Basalt Rock Company in Napa, California; sponsored by Mrs. C. A. Mayo, Jr., wife of Lieutenant Mayo, USNR; commissioned 1 May 1945 and joined the U.S. Pacific Fleet.

End-of-World War II service
On 18 July 1945, after repair duty along the California coast, Bolster departed for Pearl Harbor. She remained there until 15 August when she sailed for Yokosuka, Japan. Bolster conducted repair and salvage operations in Japanese waters until leaving for Subic Bay, Luzon, 10 October 1946. She remained in the Philippines until April 1947 and then returned to Pearl Harbor via Okinawa, Guam, and Kwajalein.

Korean War operations

Bolster operated alternately out of Pearl Harbor and Adak, Alaska, on salvage and towing duties until 22 August 1950. She then towed two barges to Sasebo, Japan, and remained in the Far East until 6 July 1951. During this tour she participated in the Inchon landing (15 September 1950) and the Hungnam Evacuation (9–25 December 1950).

Since 1952 Bolster continued to operate out of Pearl Harbor and made six tours of the Far East, visiting Japan, Hong Kong, Korea, Okinawa, and the Philippine Islands.

Vietnam service
Bolster operated in Vietnamese waters from 1966 to 1972 during the Vietnam War and was awarded 11 campaign stars.  Members of Bolster'''s crew operated on land to extract USS Clark County (LST-601) from beach after grounding at Duc Pho from 18 November – 1 December 1967.  Bolster received the Combat Action Ribbon for her service in Vietnam.

Note
The U.S. Navy (DANFS) advises that Bolster history updates for the years 1952 to 1994 are being developed.

DecommissioningBolster was decommissioned on 24 September 1994 and struck from the Navy list on the same day. She was disposed of by transfer to the Maritime Administration on 1 February 1999.  There was a private effort to save the Bolster and turn it into a floating museum, however the effort was not successful. On 12 April 2011, MARAD awarded a contract to Marine Metals of Brownsville, Tx to dismantle Bolster for $462,223.31. Bolster departed the Suisun Bay Reserve Fleet on 23 May 2011 for hull cleaning at BAE Systems San Francisco Ship Repair. Bolster was towed to Brownsville upon completion of the cleaning and is currently undergoing scrapping.

Military awards and honorsBolster's crew was eligible for the following medals, ribbons, and commendations:
 Secretary of the Navy Letter of Commendation
 Navy Meritorious Unit Commendation
 Combat Action Ribbon with two gold stars
 American Campaign Medal
 Asiatic-Pacific Campaign Medal
 World War II Victory Medal
 Navy Occupation Service Medal (with "ASIA" clasp)
 National Defense Service Medal with two stars
 Korean Service Medal with seven campaign stars
 Vietnam Service Medal with eleven campaign stars
 Republic of Vietnam Gallantry Cross Unit Citation (2 awards)
 United Nations Service Medal
 Republic of Korea War Service Medal (retroactive)
 Republic of Vietnam Campaign MedalBolster received seven battle stars for her Korean War service (9 September 1950 – 6 July 1951, 24 January – 16 August 1952, and 16 February – 15 April 1953);
 North Korean Aggression
 Communist China Aggression
 First UN Counter Offensive
 Communist China Spring Offensive
 Second Korean Winter
 Korean Defense Summer-Fall 1952
 Korea Summer-Fall 1953Bolster'' received eleven campaign stars for Vietnam War service:
 Vietnamese Counteroffensive
 Vietnamese Counteroffensive - Phase II
 Tet Counteroffensive
 Tet 69/Counteroffensive
 Vietnam Summer-Fall 1969
 Vietnam Winter-Summer 1970
 Sanctuary Counteroffensive
 Vietnamese Counteroffensive - Phase VII
 Consolidation I
 Consolidation II
 Vietnam Ceasefire

References

External links

 Basalt Rock Company Shipbuilding History

 

Bolster-class rescue and salvage ships
Ships built in Napa, California
1944 ships
World War II auxiliary ships of the United States
Historic American Engineering Record in California